Sphaeriodesmidae is a family of flat-backed millipedes in the order Polydesmida. There are about 15 genera and at least 90 described species in Sphaeriodesmidae.

Genera

References

Further reading

 
 
 
 

Polydesmida
Millipede families